Martin Staško (born 21 August 1983) is a Slovak football defender who currently plays for club Breznica. He previously played for MFK Petržalka a FC ŠTK 1914 Šamorín .

External links
at eurofotbal.cz

References

1983 births
Living people
Slovak footballers
Association football defenders
FK Inter Bratislava players
MŠK Novohrad Lučenec players
FC Petržalka players
FC ŠTK 1914 Šamorín players
Slovak Super Liga players